Moghanlu (also Romanized as Moghānlū) is a village in Qezel Gechilu Rural District, in the Central District of Mahneshan County, Zanjan Province, Iran. At the 2006 census, its population was 522, in 124 families.

References 

Populated places in Mahneshan County